"When the Love Is Good" is a song by American female pop group Big Trouble, which was released as the second and final single from the band's only studio album, Big Trouble. It was written by Giorgio Moroder and Tom Whitlock, and produced by Moroder and Brian Reeves. "When the Love Is Good" reached No. 83 on the UK Singles Chart and remained in the Top 100 for three weeks.

The song's music video was directed by Marcelo Anciano and produced by AWGO.

Critical reception
On its release, Billboard described the song as a "sweeping female-sung technoballad". In a review of Big Trouble, Saw Tek Meng of the New Straits Times commented: "Big Trouble show enough chops on tracks like "When the Love is Good" [and] "Crazy World" to indicate they should survive longer than the average female band."

Track listing
7" single
"When the Love Is Good" - 3:41
"Last Kiss" - 4:50

7" single (American promo)
"When the Love Is Good" - 3:41
"When the Love Is Good" - 3:41

12 single (UK release)
"When the Love Is Good" - 3:41
"Lipstick" - 3:14
"Last Kiss" - 4:50

12 single (Dutch release)
"When the Love Is Good" - 3:41
"Last Kiss" - 4:50

Personnel
Big Trouble
 Bobbie Eakes - lead vocals
 Julia Farey - bass, backing vocals
 Rebecca Ryan - keyboards, backing vocals
 Suzy Zarow - drums, backing vocals

Production
 Giorgio Moroder, Brian Reeves - producers of "When the Love Is Good" and "Lipstick"
 Giorgio Moroder - producer of "Last Kiss"

Charts

References

1988 songs
1988 singles
Big Trouble (band) songs
Epic Records singles
Songs written by Giorgio Moroder
Songs written by Tom Whitlock
Song recordings produced by Giorgio Moroder